The spike-heeled lark (Chersomanes albofasciata) is a species of lark in the family Alaudidae. 
It is found in southern Africa.

Its natural habitats are subtropical or tropical dry shrubland and subtropical or tropical seasonally wet or flooded lowland grassland.

Taxonomy and systematics
Originally, the spike-heeled lark was considered to belong to the genus Certhilauda (as C. albofasciata). Alternately, it has been called the rufous long-billed lark.

Subspecies 
Presently, ten subspecies are recognized. Additionally, Beesley's lark was also formerly classified as a subspecies of the spike-heeled lark. 
 Benguella rufous long-billed lark (C. a. obscurata) - Hartert, 1907: Found in south-western and central Angola
 Ovampo rufous long-billed lark (C. a. erikssoni) - (Hartert, 1907): Found in northern Namibia
 C. a. kalahariae - (Ogilvie-Grant, 1912): Originally described as a separate species in the genus Certhilauda. Found in southern and western Botswana, northern South Africa
 C. a. boweni - (Meyer de Schauensee, 1931): Found in north-western Namibia
 Damara rufous long-billed lark (C. a. arenaria) - (Reichenow, 1904): Found in southern Namibia and south-western South Africa
 C. a. barlowi - White, CMN, 1961: Found in eastern Botswana
 C. a. alticola - Roberts, 1932: Found in north-eastern South Africa
 Rufous long-billed lark (C. a. albofasciata) - (Lafresnaye, 1836): Found in south-eastern Botswana to central South Africa
 C. a. garrula - (Smith, A, 1846): Originally described as a separate species in the genus Certhilauda. Found in western South Africa
 C. a. macdonaldi - (Winterbottom, 1958): Found in southern South Africa

Gallery

References

External links

 Species text - The Atlas of Southern African Birds

spike-heeled lark
Birds of Southern Africa
spike-heeled lark
Taxonomy articles created by Polbot